Pietro Bestetti (12 December 1898 – 3 January 1936) was an Italian cyclist. He competed in two events at the 1920 Summer Olympics. He finished in second place in the 1925 Paris–Roubaix and rode in four editions of the Giro d'Italia in the 1920s.

References

External links
 

1898 births
1936 deaths
Italian male cyclists
Olympic cyclists of Italy
Cyclists at the 1920 Summer Olympics
Cyclists from Milan
People from Pioltello